Chippi may refer to:
 Muslim Chhipi, a community of India
 Chhipi, a river in Sundarbans
 Antonio Barijho, nicknamed Chipi, Argentine footballer
 Zvonko Pantović, nicknamed Čipi, Serbian musician

See also 
 Çipi, an Albanian name (see for list of people)
 Chippy (disambiguation)
 Chippie
 Chippis, a municipality in Switzerland